Alexandra Lebenthal is an American businesswoman. She was the President and Chief Executive Officer of the municipal bond franchise Lebenthal & Company until June 2017.

Early life and education
Lebenthal was born to a Jewish family. Her father is James A. Lebenthal. Her grandparents, Louis and Sayra Fischer Lebenthal, founded Lebenthal & Company in 1925.

Lebenthal graduated with an A.B in history from Princeton University in 1986 after graduating from the Nightingale-Bamford School.

Career
Lebenthal started her career in municipal bond investing at Kidder, Peabody & Company.

In 1988, Lebenthal followed in the footsteps of her father James A. Lebenthal and became the company spokesperson. By 1995 she became the company's president and CEO at the age of 31. In 2001, Lebenthal & Company was sold to AdVest, which was later acquired by Merrill Lynch. In 2007, Lebenthal regained the rights to the name for a reported sum of $1,000.

In 1999 Lebenthal was named one of New York's 100 most influential women by Crain's New York Business. In 2012 Fortune called Alexandra Lebenthal "The new queen of Wall Street." She has also been named one of the top 50 Women in Wealth Management by Wealth Manager Magazine.

Lebenthal authored a novel entitled Recessionistas in 2013.

She stepped down as CEO in 2017, and her brother James, chief of asset management, left as well.

In 2017, James Cayne sued Lebenthal for allegedly refusing to fully repay a personal loan in the amount of $1 million, and in October 2017 a New York judge ruled in his favor.

Boards and philanthropy
Lebenthal has served on the boards of the School of American Ballet, the New York Botanical Garden, and The Committee of 200, an organization for businesswomen. She also co-founded The Women's Executive Circle, a women's mentorship program. Lebenthal is a board member of Savvy Ladies, "a non-profit organization that provides financial literacy education and resources for women."

Personal life
Lebenthal married Jay Diamond and has three children: Ellie, Charlotte, and Ben.

She is a member of Kappa Beta Phi.

References

External links 
 Alexandra Lebenthal at lebenthal.com

Living people
People from Manhattan
American women chief executives
21st-century American novelists
Jewish American novelists
1964 births
Princeton University alumni
Businesspeople from New York City
Novelists from New York (state)
American chief executives of financial services companies
21st-century American women writers
Nightingale-Bamford School alumni
21st-century American Jews